Dharmaraja refers to several things in Buddhism and Hinduism:

 Dharmaraja, the original Sanskrit term for Chogyal, which may refer to a righteous ruler of Sikkim or Bhutan, or a higher-ranking monk in Tibetan Buddhism
 Dharmaraja or Kalarupa, a wrathful dharmapala and possibly an emanation of Manjusri
Dharmaraj, a name of Yudhishthira in Mahabharata
 Dharmaraj, the Hindu God of justice and the spiritual father of Yudhishthira
Dharmaraja, a name of Yama
 Dharmaraja (Buddhism), the title of a Buddha, often mentioned in the Buddhist scriptures

 Films
 Dharma Raja (film), a 1980 Indian Tamil film directed by M. A. Thirumugam

 People
 Dharma Raja, the Maharajah of Travancore from 1758 to 1798

 Places
 Dharmaraja College, in Sri Lanka

See also
 Devaraja
 Maha Thammaracha (disambiguation)